Begin Again is a South Korean television program which airs on JTBC.

Season 1 aired on Sundays at 22:30 (KST) from June 25 to September 10, 2017.

Season 2 aired on Fridays at 21:20 (KST) from March 30 to June 29, 2018.

Season 3 aired on Fridays at 21:00 (KST) from July 19 to November 8, 2019.

Season 4, also known as Begin Again Korea (비긴어게인 코리아) aired on Saturdays at 23:00 (KST), from June 6 to July 4, 2020 and on Sundays at 23:00 (KST) from July 12 to August 9.

A New Year Special series, also known as Begin Again - Intermission (비긴어게인 - 인터미션), aired on Fridays at 22:30 (KST), beginning January 6 to February 10, 2023.

Airtime

Overview
Reputable musicians from South Korea travel overseas, to places where no one knows anything about them, and hold busking events. They would introduce themselves to the people in other countries through their performances.

For Season 4 (Begin Again Korea), different from the previous 3 seasons, the cast members travel around South Korea to conduct Social Distancing Busking. The main purpose is to present music as a gift, to console the Korean citizens who have gone through difficult times due to the current COVID-19 pandemic.

Spin-offs
A year-end special titled Begin Again Reunion (비긴어게인 Reunion) aired on December 22, 2020, with the lineup featuring Yoon Do-hyun, Paul Kim, Henry, Lee Hi and Lee Su-hyun.

An online version of the show Begin Again Open Mic (비긴어게인 오픈마이크) was launched, and videos are uploaded on the show's Youtube channel on Mondays and Wednesdays at 18:00 (KST) beginning May 11, 2021. Originally, Begin Again Open Mic was aired on JTBC from December 29, 2020 to February 11, 2021.

A New Year Special titled Begin Again - Intermission (비긴어게인 - 인터미션) aired from January 6, 2023 to February 10, 2023, with two lineups airing interwoven. Group 1 featured Lena Park, Kim Jong-wan (Nell), Kang Min-kyung (Davichi), John Park, Choi Jung-hoon (Jannabi), Kim Do-hyung (Jannabi) and Jeong Dong-hwan (MeloMance) while Group 2 featured Yim Jae-beom, Ha Dong-kyun, Kim Feel, Heize, Hynn, Sungha Jung and Kim Hyun-woo (DickPunks).

Cast
Season 1 (Begin Us)
 Lee So-ra
 You Hee-yeol (Toy)
 Yoon Do-hyun (YB)
 Noh Hong-chul

Season 2 (Team Kim Yoon-ah)
 Kim Yoon-ah (Jaurim)
  (Jaurim)
 
 Roy Kim
 Jeong Se-woon (Episode 5-7)

Season 2 (Team Lena Park/Family Band)
 Lena Park
 
 Henry
 Lee Su-hyun (AKMU)

Season 3 (Family Band)
 Lena Park
 Hareem
 Henry
 Lee Su-hyun (AKMU)
 
 Kim Feel

Season 3 (Dick2JukPaulTaeng)
 Lee Juck
 Taeyeon (Girls' Generation)
 Paul Kim
 Jukjae
 Kim Hyun-woo (DickPunks)

Season 4 (Begin Again Korea)
 Lee So-ra (Episode 1-5)
 Hareem
 Henry
 Lee Su-hyun (AKMU)
 Jukjae
 Crush (Episode 1-3, 8-10)
 Jung Seung-hwan
 Lee Hi (Episode 4-6, 10)
 Sohyang (Episode 6-10)
Begin Again - Intermission - Group 1
 Lena Park
 Kim Jong-wan (Nell)
 Kang Min-kyung (Davichi)
 John Park
 Choi Jung-hoon (Jannabi)
 Kim Do-hyung (Jannabi)
 Jeong Dong-hwan (MeloMance)

Begin Again - Intermission - Group 2
 Yim Jae-beom
 Ha Dong-kyun
 Kim Feel
 Heize
 Hynn
 Sungha Jung
 Kim Hyun-woo (DickPunks)

Episodes
Season 1

Season 2

Season 3

Season 4 (Begin Again Korea)

Discography
Recordings of some of the busking songs were released digitally on various music sites.

Season 1

Episode 2

Episode 3

Episode 4

Episode 5

Episode 6

Episode 7

Episode 8

Episode 9

Episode 10

Episode 11

Episode 12

Season 2

Jaurim Begin Again: Porto Live

Jaurim Begin Again: Lisbon Live

Jaurim Begin Again: Portugal Live 2CD

Roy Kim Live in Begin Again 2

Begin Again 2 Yoon Gun Special Edition

Season 3

Episode 1

Episode 2

Episode 3

Episode 4

Episode 5

Episode 7

Episode 8

Episode 9

Episode 10

Episode 11

Episode 12

Episode 13

Episode 14

Season 4 (Begin Again Korea)

Episode 1

Episode 3

Episode 5

Episode 6

Episode 7

Episode 8

Episode 9

Episode 10

Ratings 
In the ratings below, the highest rating for the show will be in red, and the lowest rating for the show will be in blue each year.
 Note that the show airs on a cable channel (pay TV), which plays part in its slower uptake and relatively small audience share when compared to programs broadcast (FTA) on public networks such as KBS, SBS, MBC or EBS.
 NR rating means "not reported".
 TNmS have stopped publishing their rating reports from June 2018.

Season 1

Season 2

Season 3

Season 4 (Begin Again Korea)

New Year's Special (Begin Again - Intermission)

References

Notes

External links
 
 
 
 
 Begin Again YouTube Channel

South Korean travel television series
Korean-language television shows
JTBC original programming
2017 South Korean television series debuts
South Korean variety television shows
South Korean reality television series
2020s South Korean television series